North Carolina's 40th Senate district is one of 50 districts in the North Carolina Senate. It has been represented by Democrat Joyce Waddell since 2015.

Geography
Since 1993, the district has covered part of Mecklenburg County. The district overlaps with the 99th, 100th, 102nd, 103rd, and 112th state house districts.

District officeholders since 1993

Election results

2022

2020

2018

2016

2014

2012

2010

2008

2006

2004

2002

2000

References

North Carolina Senate districts
Mecklenburg County, North Carolina